Derlis Venancio Gómez López (born 2 November 1972) is a retired Paraguayan footballer who played as a goalkeeper.

Career
Gómez played club football for Club Sol de América, Club Guaraní, Club 12 de Octubre, Sportivo Luqueño, Club Olimpia, Club Libertad and Club Nacional in Paraguay and Quilmes Atlético Club in Argentina.

Gómez was also part of the Paraguay national team. He was named in his country's squad for the 2006 FIFA World Cup in Germany, though he did not start for the team.

In April 2003, Gómez was banned from playing in CONMEBOL-organized competitions for 6 months following a positive doping test.

See also
List of doping cases in sport

References

External links

playerhistory

1972 births
Living people
Paraguayan footballers
Club Sol de América footballers
Club Olimpia footballers
Club Libertad footballers
Club Guaraní players
Sportivo Luqueño players
Club Nacional footballers
Quilmes Atlético Club footballers
12 de Octubre Football Club players
Paraguay international footballers
2006 FIFA World Cup players
Association football goalkeepers
Doping cases in association football
Paraguayan sportspeople in doping cases
1993 Copa América players
Expatriate footballers in Argentina
Paraguayan expatriate sportspeople in Argentina
People from Central Department